Yndiara Asp (born 19 October 1997) is a Brazilian professional skateboarder. She has competed in women's park events at several World Skateboarding Championships, finishing 10th in 2018 and 36th in 2019. She has also competed at X Games, placing 4th in 2018.

She is placed eighth in the women's park event at the 2021 Tokyo Olympics.

References

External links
 
 Yndiara Asp at The Boardr
 Yndiara Asp at Tokyo 2020 Olympics

Living people
1997 births
Brazilian skateboarders
Brazilian sportswomen
Female skateboarders
Olympic skateboarders of Brazil
Skateboarders at the 2020 Summer Olympics
Sportspeople from Florianópolis
21st-century Brazilian women